The 2019–20 Air Force Falcons men's ice hockey season was the 52nd season of play for the program and the 14th season in the Atlantic Hockey conference. The Falcons represented the United States Air Force Academy and were coached by Frank Serratore, in his 23rd season.

On March 12, 2020, Atlantic Hockey announced that the remainder of the conference tournament was cancelled due to the coronavirus pandemic.

Departures

Recruiting

Roster
As of August 16, 2019.

Standings

Schedule and results

|-
!colspan=12 style=";" | Exhibition

|-
!colspan=12 style=";" | Regular Season

|-
!colspan=12 style=";" | 

|- align="center" bgcolor="#e0e0e0"
|colspan=12|Air Force Won Series 2–0

Scoring Statistics

Goaltending statistics

Rankings

Awards and honors

Atlantic Hockey

References

Air Force Falcons men's ice hockey seasons
Air Force Falcons
Air Force Falcons
Air Force Falcons
Air Force Falcons